Cyrus Beers (June 21, 1786 – June 5, 1850) was an American businessman and politician who served briefly as a U.S. Representative from New York from December 1838 to March 1839.

Biography
Born in Newtown, Connecticut, Beers moved with his parents to New York City. He obtained a limited education in the public schools. He married Phebe Gregory, and they had two sons, John and George.

Career
Beers engaged in mercantile pursuits and the lumber business. He moved to Ithaca, New York, in 1821 and engaged in the mercantile business. As well as his business pursuits, he served as delegate to the Democratic State convention at Herkimer in 1830. He was appointed commissioner of deeds at Ithaca in 1837.

Tenure in Congress 
Elected as a Democrat to the Twenty-fifth Congress to fill the vacancy caused by the death of Andrew DeWitt Bruyn Beers was U. S. Representative for the twenty-second district of New York and served from December 3, 1838, to March 3, 1839. He was not a candidate for renomination in 1838 but served as delegate to the New York and Erie Railroad Convention at Ithaca in 1839. He resumed his former business pursuits in Ithaca, New York.

Death
Beers died in Ithaca, Tompkins County, New York, on June 5, 1850 (age 63 years, 349 days). He is interred at City Cemetery, Ithaca, New York.

References

External links

1786 births
1850 deaths
Democratic Party members of the United States House of Representatives from New York (state)
19th-century American politicians
Members of the United States House of Representatives from New York (state)